Voivodeship court was a common court of the first instance in Polish People's Republic from 1950 to 1989, and in the Third Polish Republic from 1989 to 1998. On 1 January 1999, the voivodeship courts, had been reformed into the regional courts, with the 2nd article of the 1st legislative act of 18 December 1998.

Citations

Notes

References 

Judiciary of Poland